The 1968 Vermont gubernatorial election took place on November 5, 1968. Incumbent Democrat Philip H. Hoff did not run for re-election to another term as Governor of Vermont. Republican candidate Deane C. Davis defeated Democratic candidate John J. Daley to succeed him.

Democratic primary

Results

Republican primary

Results

General election

Results

References

Vermont
1968
Gubernatorial
November 1968 events in the United States